Dimosthenis Manousakis  (Greek: Δημοσθένης Μανουσάκης; born 19 January 1981) is a Greek former professional footballer.

Career
Manousakis began his professional career by signing with Skoda Xanthi F.C. in July 1998. He never appeared for the club in a league match, instead he went on loan to Nafpaktiakos Asteras F.C. and Egaleo F.C. He also played for Cypriot side Ethnikos Achna FC. He was only the second Lemnian footballer who played in the Superleague Greece, after Vertsonis who had played in Apollon Smyrni in the late '60s

International

Manousakis first called at national Greek football team U-17 at 1997, which competed in an international tournament in Portugal in February and in France. Indeed, on 03/27/97 scored his first goal in a match at Gabon. Also in 1998 he was a member of the Greece U19 that played in the knockout stage of the European Championship in Scotland. Also was a member of the Greek Olympic Football team in 2004.

Honours & Statistics

 Champions Football League: 4 
 2000–01 with Egaleo
 2002–03 with Chalkidona
 2012–13 with Kalloni
 2013–14 with Niki Volos

Appearances in Greece (up to July 2014): 381 
 Super League: 92
 Football League: 221
 Football League 2: 10
 Delta Ethniki: 11
 Greek Cup: 42
 UEFA Europa League: 5

Goals in Greece (up to July 2014): 54
 Super League: 7
 Football League: 33
 Football League 2: 1
 Delta Ethniki: 2
 Greek Cup: 11

References

External links
Profile at Onsports.gr
soccerterminal.com
 

1981 births
Living people
Greek footballers
Footballers at the 2000 Summer Olympics
Olympic footballers of Greece
Association football forwards
Xanthi F.C. players
Egaleo F.C. players
Atromitos F.C. players
Aiolikos F.C. players
Ionikos F.C. players
Trikala F.C. players
Ethnikos Achna FC players
Chalkidona F.C. players
Super League Greece players
Football League (Greece) players
Cypriot First Division players
Expatriate footballers in Cyprus
People from Lemnos
Sportspeople from the North Aegean